Abhik Mitra (born 11 January 1958) is an Indian former cricketer. He played 26 first-class matches for Bengal between 1978 and 1987.

See also
 List of Bengal cricketers

References

External links
 

1958 births
Living people
Indian cricketers
Bengal cricketers
Cricketers from Kolkata